WRSG (91.5 FM) is a non-commercial high school radio station licensed to serve Middlebourne, West Virginia. The station is owned by Tyler Consolidated High School and licensed to the Tyler County Board of Education. It airs a Variety format.

The station was assigned the callsign WRSG by the Federal Communications Commission on July 3, 2000.

The station began carrying the syndicated Pink Floyd program Floydian Slip with Craig Bailey on April 10, 2011.

References

External links
 Knights Radio 91.5 on Facebook
 

RSG
Radio stations established in 2001
High school radio stations in the United States
Tyler County, West Virginia